Mike Bushell is an English sports presenter for the BBC. He presents the sport on BBC Breakfast on Thursdays, Fridays and at the weekends, and sometimes on other weekdays. Bushell holds the world record for participating in the greatest number of different sports, on his Saturday morning slot on BBC One. In 2019, he participated in series 17 of the television dance show Strictly Come Dancing, he was the seventh contestant to be eliminated alongside his professional dance partner Katya Jones.

Early life, education and career 
Bushell spent his teenage years in Yorkshire after growing up in northern Hertfordshire, attending Ashwell School where his father John was headmaster. When he was 8 he started his own newspaper, called the Daily Owl and sold it and delivered it to friends in the village for a penny. He once got into trouble for giving away his new Christmas present as a prize for a competition. He played chess for Hertfordshire and ran in the county cross country team. His ambition at a young age was to be either a zookeeper or field biologist, but after a jape with a weasel went disastrously wrong he had to change tack. Bushell wrote an opera at the age of 11 and kept alive his musical ambitions later in two bands.

In 1977 his family moved to Harrogate and he went to secondary school at Granby High School. He sometimes took a tape recorder to school to record the day's events. It was here during a production of Hobson's Choice that he first got the drama bug and played the part of Willie Mossop. He went on to join the National Youth Theatre.

Bushell obtained a 2:1 degree in Drama & Television at King Alfred's College in Winchester, now the University of Winchester. Once he left he appeared as a Roman Centurion and King Arthur on the streets of Winchester, for the tourist board, and in the National Youth Theatre production of Good Lads at Heart, working alongside Liza Tarbuck. In order to pay his college debts he got a job on the Hampshire Chronicle newspaper in Winchester and was posted to the Eastleigh office, and he was "hooked by the journalism bug".

While training on the reporter's job, Bushell formed a band with other journalists and sang in many gigs in the East End of London, around Stratford.
 
He later toured Europe as vocalist for Don't Push the River, forming a musical partnership with Nigel Smith, writer of the comedy series Teenage Kicks. Bushell sang for the band Arthur the Stoat, alongside Tim Rafferty and Pete Babes Wilson. Arthur the Stoat was initially formed in rural Suffolk in 1992, and the music is a typically English psychedelic folk pop.

In 1982, he took part in It's A Knockout, representing Winchester in two games of a domestic heat, but his team finished bottom of three.

In 1990, after stints on the Derby Evening Telegraph and the Windsor and Slough Observer, he got his first broadcasting job at BBC Radio Solent as a trainee reporter. He then moved to television, as a news, sport and entertainment reporter–presenter for BBC South Today before joining the BBC News channel, and later BBC Breakfast.

Career 
Bushell presents the sport on BBC Breakfast on Fridays and at the weekends, and sometimes on other weekdays. Bushell holds the world record for trying different sports, on his Saturday morning slot, on BBC One, in which he tries to "inspire people off the sofa", to" be more active" and "try a new activity". He maintains there is a sport for all, and no one should feel they can't do it. He has consequently tried out and profiled over 550 sports: ranging from shin kicking, whip cracking and swamp soccer to newer more mainstream sport initiatives like Rush hockey, spike volleyball, and shopping centre squash. His features often include tips from sporting figures such as Serena Williams, Colin Montgomerie and Ben Ainslie.

He has his own web page: Bushell's Best, on the pages of the BBC News website. For Sport Relief in 2012, he set the world record for travelling across water in a large inflatable ball. He managed a mile in 1 hour and 57 minutes, during which time he needed 8 oxygen breaks. In June 2013, his first book Bushell's Best Bits was published.

He has been with the BBC News channel since its launch in 1997, and appeared on Celebrity Mastermind on 28 December 2013. He made his pantomime debut playing a sports reporter in Aladdin in Northampton in 2010 opposite Chesney Hawkes.

On 11 April 2018, during a live broadcast at the 2018 Commonwealth Games in Gold Coast, Australia, Bushell fell into a swimming pool after misplacing a step whilst interviewing some of the English swimming team, including Adam Peaty. Due to the fall, his microphone eventually stopped working and coverage had to revert to the studios. A video of the moment was shared 11.5 million times in one day.

In January 2018, Bushell participated in And They're Off! in aid of Sport Relief.

On 19 November 2021, Bushell took part in the Children In Need 'I Can See Your Voice' special alongside newsreader Kate Silverton and Final Score host Jason Mohammad. The judges(Alison Hammond, Amanda Holden and Jimmy Carr) chose Bushell as the bad singer.

Personal life

Family 
Bushell has three daughters. In May 2019 he married Emily, a marketing executive, whom he met in a neighbouring village.
 He has a goddaughter called Freya

Leisure 

Bushell is interested in running, having run six marathons in as many days when aged 15. It was a 175-mile trip along with friend Simon Wild and they raised thousands of pounds for the International Year of Disabled People.  Bushell plays football and is a runner with the Hash House Harriers, and tries out different sports for his Saturday role weekly. He claims to have experienced over 350 different sports.

Bushell is a fan of Leeds United.

References

External links
 
 

Year of birth missing (living people)
Living people
BBC World News
Alumni of the University of Winchester
National Youth Theatre members
People from Ashwell, Hertfordshire
BBC sports presenters and reporters